Wodage Zvadya (Hebrew: וודג' זבדיה; born 7 September 1973) is an Israeli long-distance runner who specializes in the marathon.

Biography
He was an Ethiopian citizen until 1991 when he emigrated to Israel. He won the silver medal at the 2001 Summer Universiade. His best finish at the European or World Championships was a 22nd place at the 2002 European Championships. He also competed at the 2006 European Championships, the 2005, 2007 and 2009 World Championships and the 2001, 2002 and 2005 World Half Marathon Championships.

His personal best times are 14:07.14 minutes in the 5000 metres, achieved in July 1996 in Hechtel; 29:38.88 minutes in the 10,000 metres, achieved in May 1996 in Tel Aviv; 1:04:30 hours in the half marathon, achieved at the 2001 Summer Universiade in Beijing; and 2:16:04 seconds in the marathon, achieved in January 2004 in Tiberias.

Achievements

References

1973 births
Living people
Israeli male long-distance runners
Ethiopian emigrants to Israel
Citizens of Israel through Law of Return
Israeli people of Ethiopian-Jewish descent
Sportspeople of Ethiopian descent
Ethiopian Jews
Israeli male marathon runners
Ethiopian male long-distance runners
Ethiopian male marathon runners
World Athletics Championships athletes for Israel
Universiade medalists in athletics (track and field)
Universiade silver medalists for Israel
Medalists at the 2001 Summer Universiade